is a Buddhist temple of the Tendai-shū, located in Sakyō-ku of Kyoto-shi, in the prefecture of Kyoto, Japan. It is specified as a natural monument by the Kyoto government.

History
It was built in 1012 under the reign of Emperor Sanjō in the imperial year Chōwa 2. Its original purpose was to serve as temple quarters for priests from the nearby  temple.

Structure
One of the rooms features a blood stained ceiling that was originally a floorpiece from Fushimi Castle. The blood is from Torii Mototada, Tokugawa Ieyasu's retainer, and several other men who committed seppuku when the castle they were garrisoned in as being overrun by Ishida Mitsunari's forces during the siege of Fushimi castle. This battle delayed the Ishida forces, which gave Tokugawa Ieyasu time to prepare for the Battle of Sekigahara and eventually unify Japan under the Tokugawa Shogunate. Thus, Torii Mototada's act of valor is honored through having the bloody floorpiece serve as a piece of Hōsen-in.

Visiting
At the entrance, along with paying the fee, guests are given a ticket that can be used for refreshments at the end.
Guests are passed through a washitsu featuring such sights including a five-leafed pine.
This temple also features a garden called Hōrakuen, or "Treasure Paradise"
At the end, the refreshments ticket can be exchanged for green tea and some light snacks.

See also
 Sanzen-in
 Shōmyō
 Suikinkutsu

References

External links

Buddhist temples in Kyoto
Tendai temples